The Suzuki Boulevard M109R motorcycle was introduced in 2006 as Suzuki's flagship V-Twin cruiser. In some parts of the world, it is marketed as the Suzuki Intruder M1800R.

See also  
Suzuki Boulevard C109R 
Suzuki Boulevard M50

External links 
 2020 Suzuki Boulevard M109R B.O.S.S.

Boulevard M109R
Cruiser motorcycles
Motorcycles introduced in 2006